Ozernoy is a small early Holocene basaltic shield volcano located in the southern part of the Kamchatka Peninsula in Russia. The massive Ksudach volcano is located nearby.

See also
 List of volcanoes in Russia

References 

 

Mountains of the Kamchatka Peninsula
Volcanoes of the Kamchatka Peninsula
Shield volcanoes of Russia
Holocene shield volcanoes
Holocene Asia